

History
Bluefish Communications was formed in 2004 by Phil Howarth, Lyndon Knight and Brian Birtles. 

Bluefish is a consulting organisation owned by Vodafone Global Enterprise with offices across the globe. It specialises in consulting, resourcing, outsourcing, and smartsourcing.

Bluefish is independently recognised for its achievements in the following:
 The Sunday Times Tech Track 100 "fastest growing UK technology companies" for three consecutive years in 2007, 2008 and 2009.  
 Deloitte Fast 50 2010 UK's fastest growing technology companies.
 Deloitte Fast 500 2010 EMEA's fastest growing technology companies.

On 1 December 2011, Vodafone Global Enterprise acquired Bluefish Communications. The acquired operations focused on implementing strategies and solutions in cloud computing and professional services.

Operations
Bluefish Communications Limited is organised into the following geographical divisions:
 Northern Europe
 Central Europe
 Southern Europe and Africa
 Asia Pacific and Sub-Saharan Africa
 Americas

References

External links 
 Bluefish Communications official web site

Information technology companies of the United Kingdom
International management consulting firms
Information technology consulting firms of the United Kingdom